Climax Blues Band (originally known as The Climax Chicago Blues Band) is a British blues rock band. The band was formed in Stafford, England, in 1967 by vocalist and harmonica player Colin Cooper (1939–2008), guitarist and vocalist Pete Haycock (1951–2013), guitarist Derek Holt (b. 1949), bassist and keyboardist Richard Jones (b. 1949), drummer George Newsome (b. 1947), and keyboardist Arthur Wood (1929–2005).

History
In 1972 the group shortened its name to Climax Blues Band. The band has released at least 19 albums and had a Top 10 hit in the UK with "Couldn't Get It Right". That song and "I Love You" were also hits in the United States; "Couldn't Get It Right" reached No. 3 on the Billboard Hot 100 in 1977, and "I Love You" peaked at No. 12 in 1981.

Jones left the group in 1969 and Holt began playing bass. The band switched labels to Harvest Records in 1970 and subsequent records had a more rock-oriented feel. John Cuffley replaced Newsome in 1971.

Albums issued in the 1970s include FM/Live (1973), a double set recorded at a concert in New York, and the studio albums Stamp Album (1975) and Gold Plated (1976), featuring the single "Couldn't Get It Right". In the 1970s, the band's concerts in the US were attended by up to 20,000 people. By 1981 the band was moving towards a pop-rock sound. Holt and Cuffley left in 1983.

A previously unknown recording of a live performance was released as Climax Blues Band/World Tour 1976 by the Major League Productions (MLP) record label.

The album Sample and Hold was recorded for Virgin Records in 1983 by Haycock, Cooper, and Glover, with a rhythm section composed of the session musicians Dave Marquee and Henry Spinetti. A follow-up album was in the works, but Cooper bowed out, citing personal reasons. Haycock went on to record several solo projects, the first of which was the album Total Climax, with his band, Pete Haycock's Climax; this band toured extensively in Europe, including Communist East Germany, and conducted a well-received tour in Australia. After that, Haycock was asked by his former Climax Blues Band manager, Miles Copeland, to record an instrumental album, Guitar and Son, and the live album Night of the Guitars (from the tour of the same name) for the I.R.S. No Speak label. After that tour, Haycock teamed up with the guitarist Steve Hunter and former Climax Blues bandmate Derek Holt to record the album H Factor. He was later recruited by Bev Bevan to become a member of Electric Light Orchestra Part II and recorded and toured with that group from 1990 onwards. He also started his film score career at this time, playing the lead on Hans Zimmer's score to Thelma and Louise. He also performed on the Night of the Guitars tours, which included Holt on bass, keyboards and occasional vocals.

Holt wrote "I Love You", one of the Climax Blues Band's biggest hits. It is included on the Climax Blues Band double album, 25 Years 1968–1993, released by the German label Repertoire in 1993. "I Love You" still gets over 20,000 radio hits a year in the US and was used in Finn Taylor's 2002 film Cherish and in Kevin Smith's 2008 film Zach and Miri make a Porno. In 1983 Holt joined drummer Brendan Day and Nektar guitarist Roye Albrighton to record an album under the name Grand Alliance for the A&M label.

In 1985, Cooper and Glover recruited guitarist Lester Hunt, drummer Roy Adams, and original member Derek Holt to record the Climax Blues Band album Drastic Steps, and this line-up toured in support of the album in the UK, Europe, and America. The new line-up soon became established with Cooper, Glover, Hunt, Adams and Neil Simpson in the early 1990s, releasing the live album Blues from the Attic in 1993 and Big Blues in 2004.

Colin Cooper (born 7 October 1939) died of cancer on 3 July 2008, at age 68. He is survived by his wife and two children. He wanted the band to continue, as the other musicians had all been long-serving (Glover since 1980, Adams and Hunt since 1985, and Simpson since 1991). Cooper was replaced by singer and saxophone and harmonica player Johnny Pugh, who retired in 2012, and was replaced in turn by vocalist Graham Dee and saxophone player Chris Aldridge. Pete Haycock died on 30 October 2013, at age 62.

Currently, the band continues to tour without any remaining original members.

Lineups

Timeline

Discography

Albums

Albums (guest appearance)
 Three's a Crowd, Tarney/Spencer Band (1978)

Singles

References

Other sources

External links
Climax Blues Band official website

1967 establishments in England
Musical groups established in 1967
British soft rock music groups
English blues rock musical groups
Musical groups from Staffordshire
EMI Records artists
Parlophone artists
Harvest Records artists
Sire Records artists
Polydor Records artists
Virgin Records artists
Warner Records artists